Kalaiyarasan Harikrishnan is an Indian actor, who works in the Tamil film industry. He has collaborated with directors Myshkin and Pa. Ranjith, with whom he worked in Madras (2014) for which he received acclaim for his performance.

Career
Kalaiyarasan, a graduate in Computer Applications from SRM Institute of Science and Technology, initially began work as an actor with Parthy Bhaskar's Arjunan Kadhali in 2010, but the film remains unreleased. He then worked with director Myshkin on two ventures, Nandalala (2010) and Mugamoodi (2012), and credits the film maker as his mentor. He also played small roles in Ranjith's directorial debut Attakathi (2012), playing the suitor to the heroine, as well as in Vikram Sugumaran's Madha Yaanai Koottam (2013).

Kalaiyarasan's breakthrough as an actor came through his performance in Ranjith's drama film Madras (2014), where he portrayed the pivotal role of Anbu. Set in the backdrop of North Chennai, Kalaiyarasan auditioned and cleared three screen tests before being handed the role and worked closely with the film's lead actor Karthi in order to shown their on-screen camaraderie. Upon release in September 2014, the film became a commercial and critical acclaimed success, while Kalaiyarasan's portrayal won unanimous praise. A critic from Behindwoods.com noted Kalaiyarasan "steals the show and this has to be his lifetime role", adding that "the youngster has grabbed the opportunity with both hands and we have to laud director Ranjith for giving this dynamic performer good scope to showcase his wares". Similarly Sify.com added that his performance is "riveting" and that "his body language and dialogue delivery in almost a parallel role is terrific."

Following the success of Madras, Kalaiyarasan's career in the Tamil film industry took off and garnered him higher-profile films as well as lead roles. Ranjith cast him again in a pivotal supporting role in the Rajinikanth-starrer Kabali (2016), as a school teacher with a vengeance against Rajinikanth's titular character. The film opened to positive reviews for Kalaiyarasan and subsequently went on to become the highest grossing Tamil film of all time. He first portrayed leading roles in Darling 2 (2016) and Raja Manthiri (2016), but his first high-profile project as the protagonist was C. V. Kumar's production Adhe Kangal (2017). Featuring alongside Janani Iyer and Sshivada, Kalaiyarasan portrayed a blind chef, with the makers using American chef Christine Hà as a character inspiration for his role. The film opened to positive reviews, with critics praising his portrayal of the character. Kalaiyarasan has a series of solo lead films ready for release in 2017 including Yeidhavan, China, Pattinapakkam and Uru. He also will be seen in Kaalakkoothu alongside Prasanna and another untitled comedy film for C. V. Kumar alongside Ashna Zaveri.

Personal life
Kalaiyarasan is married to Shanmuga Priya, who he met at Accenture, his first place of employment.

Filmography

As Actor

As dubbing artist

Web series

References

External links
 

Living people
Male actors in Tamil cinema
Indian male film actors
21st-century Indian male actors
Place of birth missing (living people)
Male actors from Chennai
1986 births